The 2013 Kontinental Hockey League All-Star Game was the All-Star game for the 2012–13 season of the Kontinental Hockey League (KHL). It took place on 13 January 2013 at the Traktor Sport Palace in Chelyabinsk, Russia, and resulted in Team East, captained by Aleksey Morozov, winning 18–11 over Team West, captained by Ilya Kovalchuk.

See also
2012–13 KHL season
Kontinental Hockey League All-Star Game

References

External links
 Official homepage

KHL All-Star Game
2013
All Star Game